Kalmykia, officially the Republic of Kalmykia, is a republic of Russia, located in the North Caucasus region of Southern Russia. The republic is part of the Southern Federal District, and borders Dagestan to the south and Stavropol Krai to the southwest; Volgograd Oblast to the northwest and north and Astrakhan Oblast to the north and east; Rostov Oblast to the west and the Caspian Sea to the east. Kalmykia is the only region in Europe where Buddhism is the predominant religion.

The republic is home to the Kalmyks, a people of Mongol origin who are primarily of Buddhist faith. The capital of the republic is the city of Elista, which has gained a reputation for international chess.

Geography
The republic is located in Southern Russia, lying north of the North Caucasus. A small stretch of the Volga River flows through eastern Kalmykia. Other major rivers include the Yegorlyk, the Kuma, and the Manych. Lake Manych-Gudilo is the largest lake; other lakes of significance include Lakes Sarpa and Tsagan-Khak.

Kalmykia's natural resources include coal, oil, and natural gas.

The republic's wildlife includes the saiga antelope, whose habitat is protected in Chyornye Zemli Nature Reserve.

Climate
The small town of Utta is the hottest place in Russia.

Flora and fauna

National Parks 
Bamb Tsetsg Tulip Island

History

According to the Kurgan hypothesis, the upland regions of modern-day Kalmykia formed part of the cradle of Indo-European culture. Hundreds of Kurgans can be seen in these areas, known as the Indo-European Urheimat (Samara culture, Sredny Stog culture, Yamna culture).

The territory of Kalmykia is unique in that it has been home to many major world religions and cultures over the course of history. Some of the first recorded peoples to move into this territory were the Scythians and Sarmatians from the central Eurasian steppe, bringing their respective religious systems with them. Later on, all three major Abrahamic religions also took root, with the Khazar conversion to Judaism being a notable (if historically contested) episode in the religion's history. The Alans were a major Muslim people group, who faced the invading Mongols and their Tengrist practices, with some of the latter settling permanently. The later Nogais were Muslim, but were replaced by the contemporaneous Kalmyks, who practice Buddhism. With the annexation of the region by the Russian Empire, there was an influx of Slavic-speaking Christian settlers. Many religious institutions were suppressed in the wake of the Russian Revolution.

Kalmyk autonomy

The ancestors of the Kalmyks, the Oirats, migrated from the steppes of southern Siberia on the banks of the Irtysh River, reaching the Lower Volga region by the early 17th century. Historians have given various explanations for the move, but generally recognise that the Kalmyks sought abundant pastures for their herds. Another motivation may have involved escaping the growing dominance of the neighbouring Dzungar Mongol tribe.
They reached the lower Volga region in or about 1630. That land, however, was not uncontested pastures, but rather the homeland of the Nogai Horde, a confederation of Turkic-speaking nomadic tribes. The Kalmyks expelled the Nogais, who fled to the Caucasian plains and to the Crimean Khanate, areas (at least theoretically) under the control of the Ottoman Empire. Some Nogai groups sought the protection of the Russian garrison at Astrakhan. The remaining nomadic Mongol Oirat tribes became vassals of the Kalmyk Khan.

The Kalmyks settled in the wide-open steppes – from Saratov in the north to Astrakhan on the Volga delta in the south and to the Terek River in the southwest. They also encamped on both sides of the Volga River, from the Don River in the west to the Ural River in the east. Although these territories had been recently annexed by the Tsardom of Russia, Moscow was in no position to settle the area with Russian colonists. This area under Kalmyk control would eventually be called the Kalmyk Khanate.

Within twenty-five years of settling in the Lower Volga region, the Kalmyks became subjects of the Tsar of Russia. In exchange for protecting Russia's southern border, the Kalmyks were promised an annual allowance and access to the markets of Russian border settlements. The open access to Russian markets was supposed to discourage mutual raiding on the part of the Kalmyks and of the Russians and Bashkirs, a Russian-dominated Turkic people, but this was not often the practice. In addition, Kalmyk allegiance was often nominal, as the Kalmyk Khans practised self-government, based on a set of laws they called the Great Code of the Nomads (Iki Tsaadzhin Bichig).

The Kalmyk Khanate reached its peak of military and political power under Ayuka Khan (ruled 1672–1724, khan 1690–1724). During his era, the Kalmyk Khanate fulfilled its responsibility to protect the southern borders of Russia and conducted many military expeditions against its Turkic-speaking neighbours. Successful military expeditions were also conducted in the Caucasus. The Khanate experienced economic prosperity from free trade with Russian border towns, with China, with Tibet and with Muslim neighbours. During this era, the Kalmyks also kept close contacts with their Oirat kinsmen in Dzungaria, as well as with the Dalai Lama in Tibet.

Russian Civil War

After the October Revolution in 1917, many Don Kalmyks joined the White Russian army and fought under the command of Generals Denikin and Wrangel during the Russian Civil War.  Before the Red Army broke through to the Crimean Peninsula towards the end of 1920, a large group of Kalmyks fled from Russia with the remnants of the defeated White Army to the Black Sea ports of Turkey.

The majority of the refugees chose to resettle in Belgrade, Serbia. Other, much smaller, groups chose Sofia (Bulgaria), Prague (Czechoslovakia) and Paris and Lyon (France).  The Kalmyk refugees in Belgrade built a Buddhist temple there in 1929.

Soviet period

In July 1919, Bolshevik leader Vladimir Lenin issued an appeal to the Kalmyk people, calling for them to revolt and to aid the Red Army.  Lenin promised to provide the Kalmyks, among other things, a sufficient quantity of land for their own use. The promise came to fruition on November 4, 1920, when a resolution was passed by the All-Russian Central Executive Committee proclaiming the formation of the Kalmyk Autonomous Oblast.  Fifteen years later, on October 22, 1935, the Oblast was elevated to republic status, Kalmyk Autonomous Soviet Socialist Republic.

In line with the policy of Korenizatsiya based on the concept of titular nations, the government of the Soviet Union adopted a strategy of national delimitation, while at the same time enforcing the Leninist principle of democratic centralism. According to Dorzha Arbakov, decentralized governing bodies were a tool the Bolsheviks used to control the Kalmyk people:

After establishing control, the Soviet authorities did not overtly enforce an anti-religion policy, other than through passive means, because it sought to bring Mongolia and Tibet into its sphere of influence.  The government also was compelled to respond to domestic disturbances resulting from the economic policies of War Communism and the 1921 famine.
The passive measures that were taken by Soviet authorities to control the people included the imposition of a harsh tax to close places of worship and religious schools. The Cyrillic script replaced Todo Bichig, the traditional Kalmyk vertical script.

On January 22, 1922, Mongolia proposed to migrate the Kalmyks during the famine in Kalmykia, but Russia refused. 71–72,000 Kalmyks died during the famine. Revolts erupted among the Kalmyks in 1926 and 1930 (on 1942–1943, see the next section). In March 1927, Soviet deported 20,000 Kalmyks to the tundras of Siberia and Karelia.

The Kalmyks of the Don Voisko Oblast were subject to the policies of de-cossackization where villages were destroyed, khuruls (temples) and monasteries were burned down and executions were indiscriminate.  At the same time, grain, livestock and other foodstuffs were seized.  
In December 1927 the Fifteenth Party Congress of the Soviet Union passed a resolution calling for the "voluntary" collectivization of agriculture.  The change in policy was accompanied by a new campaign of repression, directed initially against the small farming class. The objective of this campaign was to suppress the resistance of farming peasants to the full-scale collectivization of agriculture.

World War II
On June 22, 1941, the German army invaded the Soviet Union.  By August 12, 1942, the German Army Group South captured Elista, the capital of the Kalmyk ASSR.  After capturing the Kalmyk territory, German army officials established a propaganda campaign with the assistance of anti-communist Kalmyk nationalists, including white emigre, Kalmyk exiles. The total Jewish dead numbered between 100 and upwards of 700, according to documents held in the Kalmyk State Archives. The campaign was focused primarily on recruiting and organizing Kalmyk men into anti-Soviet militia units.

Kalmüken Verband Dr. Doll (Kalmukian Volunteers)
Abwehrtrupp 103 (Kalmukian Volunteers)
Kalmücken-Legion or Kalmücken-Kavallerie-Korps (Kalmukian Volunteers)

The Kalmyk units were extremely successful in flushing out and killing Soviet partisans. But by December 1942, the Soviet Red Army retook the Kalmyk ASSR, forcing the Kalmyks assigned to those units to flee, in some cases with their wives and children in hand.

The Kalmyk units retreated westward into unfamiliar territory with the retreating German army and were reorganized into the Kalmuck Legion, although the Kalmyks themselves preferred the name Kalmuck Cavalry Corps. The casualty rate also increased substantially during the retreat, especially among the Kalmyk officers. To replace those killed, the German army imposed forced conscription, taking in teenagers and middle-aged men. As a result, the overall effectiveness of the Kalmyk units declined.

By the end of the war, the remnants of the Kalmuck Cavalry Corps had made their way to Austria where the Kalmyk soldiers and their family members became post-war refugees.

Those who did not want to leave formed militia units that chose to stay behind and harass the oncoming Soviet Red Army.

Although a number of Kalmyks chose to fight against the Soviet Union, the majority by and large did not, fighting the German army in regular Soviet Red army units and in partisan resistance units behind the battlelines throughout the Soviet Union. Before their removal from the Soviet Red Army and from partisan resistance units after December 1943, approximately 8,000 Kalmyks were awarded various orders and medals, including 21 Kalmyk men who were recognized as a Hero of the Soviet Union.

On December 27, 1943, Soviet authorities declared that "many Kalmyks" were guilty of cooperation with the German Army and cited that as a justification to order the deportation of the entire Kalmyk population, including those who had served with the Soviet Army, to various locations in Central Asia and Siberia.  In conjunction with the deportation, the Kalmyk ASSR was abolished and its territory was split between adjacent Astrakhan, Rostov and Stalingrad Oblasts and Stavropol Krai.  To completely obliterate any traces of the Kalmyk people, the Soviet authorities renamed the former republic's towns and villages.

Post-war Kalmykia

Due to their widespread dispersal in Siberia, their language and culture suffered a possibly irreversible decline. Khrushchev finally allowed their return in 1957, when they found their homes, jobs, and land occupied by imported Russians and Ukrainians, who remained.  On January 9, 1957, Kalmykia again became an autonomous oblast, and on July 29, 1958, an autonomous republic within the Russian SFSR.

In the following years, bad planning of agricultural and irrigation projects resulted in widespread desertification. On orders from Moscow, sheep production increased beyond levels that the fragile steppe could sustain, resulting in 1.4 million acres (5666 km2) of the artificial desert. To ramp up output, economically nonviable industrial plants were constructed.

After the dissolution of the USSR, Kalmykia kept the status of an autonomous republic within the newly formed Russian Federation (effective March 31, 1992).

Politics

The head of the government in Kalmykia is called "The Head of the Republic". The President of Russia selects a candidate for the Head of the Republic position and presents it to the Parliament of Kalmyk Republic, the People's Khural, for approval.  If a candidate is not approved, the President of the Russian Federation can dissolve the Parliament and set up new elections.

From 1993 to  2010, the Head of the Republic was Kirsan Nikolayevich Ilyumzhinov. He also was the president of the world chess organization FIDE until the Russo-Ukrainian War. He has spent much of his fortune on promoting chess in Kalmykia—where chess is compulsory in all primary schools—and also overseas, with Elista, the capital of Kalmykia, hosting many international tournaments.

In the late 1990s, the Ilyumzhinov government was alleged to be spending too much government money on chess-related projects. The allegations were published in Sovietskaya Kalmykia, the opposition newspaper in Elista. Larisa Yudina, the journalist who investigated these accusations, was kidnapped and murdered in 1998. Two men, Sergei Vaskin and Tyurbi Boskomdzhiv, who worked in the local civil service, were charged with her murder, one of them having been a former presidential bodyguard. After prolonged investigations by the Russian authorities, both men were found guilty and jailed, but no evidence was discovered that Ilyumzhinov himself was in any way responsible.

On October 24, 2010, Ilyumzhinov was replaced by Alexey Orlov as the new Head of Kalmykia. Since September 2019 the acting President of Kalmykia is Batu Khasikov.

Since 2008, Anatoly Kozachko has been President of the Parliament, the People's Khural. The current Prime Minister of Kalmykia is Lyudmila Ivanovna. All the three top politicians belong to the Kremlin's "United Russia" Party.

The Kalmyk Nationalist Oirat-Kalmyk People’s Congress has been convening since 2015 and supporting certain people in the People's Khural of Kalmykia elections, as well as pushing for political change inside Kalmykia.

Administrative divisions

Demographics

Population: 

Life expectancy:

Vital statistics

Source: Russian Federal State Statistics Service

Ethnic groups

According to the 2021 Census, Kalmyks make up 62.5% of the republic's population. Other groups include Russians (25.7%), Dargins (2.8%), Kazakhs (1.7%), Turks (1.6%), Chechens (1.1%), Avars (1.0%), and Koreans (0.4%).

This statistics is about the demographics of the Kalmyks in the Russian Empire, Soviet Union and Russian Federation.

Religion

Tibetan Buddhism is the traditional and most popular religion among the Kalmyks, while Russians in the country practice predominantly Russian Orthodoxy. A minority of Kalmyks practice pre-Buddhist shamanism or Tengrism (a contemporary revival of the Turkic and Mongolic shamanic religions). Many people are unaffiliated and non-religious.

According to a 2012 survey, 47.6% of the population of Kalmykia adhere to Buddhism, 18% to the Russian Orthodox Church, 4.8% to Islam, 3% to Tengrism or Kalmyk shamanism, 1% are unaffiliated Christians, 1% are either Orthodox Christian believers who do not belong to a church or are members of non-Russian Orthodox churches, 0.4% adhere to forms of Hinduism, and 9.0% follow other religions or did not give an answer to the survey. In addition, 13% of the population declared themselves to be "spiritual but not religious" and another 13% to be atheist.

Education
Kalmyk State University is the largest higher education facility in the republic.

Economy

Kalmykia has a developed agricultural sector.  Other developed industries include the food processing and oil and gas industries.

As most of Kalmykia is arid, irrigation is necessary for agriculture. The Cherney Zemli Irrigation Scheme in southern Kalmykia receives water from the Caucasian rivers Terek and Kuma via a chain of canals: water flows from the Terek to the Kuma via the Terek-Kuma Canal, then to the Chogray Reservoir on the East Manych River via the Kuma-Manych Canal, and finally into Kalmykia's steppes over the Cherney Zemli Main Canal, constructed in the 1970s.

The government of Kalmykia spends about $100 million annually. Its annual oil production is about 1,270,000 barrels.

Emigration and culture

The Kalmyks of Kyrgyzstan live primarily in the Karakol region of eastern Kyrgyzstan. They are referred to as Sart Kalmyks. The origin of this name is unknown. Likewise, it is not known when, why and from where this small group of Kalmyks migrated to eastern Kyrgyzstan. Due to their minority status, the Sart Kalmyks have adopted the Kyrgyz language and culture of the majority Kyrgyz population. As a result, nearly all now are Muslims.

Although Sart Kalmyks are Muslims, Kalmyks elsewhere, by and large, remain faithful to the Gelugpa Order of Tibetan Buddhism. In Kalmykia, for example, the Gelugpa Order with the assistance of the government has constructed numerous Buddhist temples. In addition, the Kalmyk people recognize Tenzin Gyatso, 14th Dalai Lama as their spiritual leader and Erdne Ombadykow, a Kalmyk American, as the supreme lama of the Kalmyk people. The Dalai Lama has visited Elista on a number of occasions.

The Kalmyks have also established communities in the United States, primarily in Pennsylvania and New Jersey. The majority are descended from those Kalmyks who fled from Russia in late 1920 to France, Yugoslavia, Bulgaria, and, later, Germany.  Many of those Kalmyks living in Germany at the end of World War II were eventually granted passage to the United States.

As a consequence of their decades-long migration through Europe, many older Kalmyks are fluent in German, French, and Serbo-Croatian, in addition to Russian and their native Kalmyk language. There are several Kalmyk Buddhist temples in Monmouth County, New Jersey, where the vast majority of American Kalmyks reside, as well as a Tibetan Buddhist Learning Center and monastery in Washington Township, New Jersey. At one point during the 20th century, there was a Kalmyk Buddhist temple in Belgrade, Serbia.

The word Kalmyk means 'those who remained'. Its origin is unknown but this name was known centuries before a large part of the Kalmyks moved back from the Volga River to Dzhungaria in the 18th century.

There are three cultural subgroups within the Kalmyk nation: Turguts, Durbets (Durwets), and Buzavs (Oirats, who joined the Russian Cossacks), as well as some villages of Hoshouts and Zungars. The Durbets subgroup includes the Chonos tribe (literally meaning "a tribe of the wolf", also called "Shonos", "Chinos", "A-Shino", or "A-Chino"), which is considered to be one of the most ancient tribes in the world, dating back to the 6th to 11th century.

Kalmykia staged the 2006 World Chess Championship between Veselin Topalov and Vladimir Kramnik.

See also
 Buddhism in Kalmykia
 Music of Kalmykia
 Geden Sheddup Choikorling Monastery
 Burkhan Bakshin Altan Sume

References

Notes

Explanatory notes

Citations

General sources

Further reading
 Arbakov, Dorzha. Genocide in the USSR, Chapter II, "Complete Destruction of National Groups as Groups, The Kalmyks", Nikolai Dekker and Andrei Lebed, Editors, Series I, No. 40, Institute for the Study of the USSR, Munich, 1958.
 Balinov, Shamba. Genocide in the USSR, Chapter V, "Attempted Destruction of Other Religious Groups, The Kalmyk Buddhists", Nikolai Dekker and Andrei Lebed, Editors, Series I, No. 40, Institute for the Study of the USSR, Munich, 1958.
 Bethell, Nicholas. The Last Secret, Futura Publications Limited, Great Britain, 1974.
 Corfield, Justin. The History of Kalmykia: From Ancient times to Kirsan Ilyumzhinov and Aleksey Orlov, Australia, 2015. The first major history of Kalmykia in English, heavily illustrated, and drawing on interviews with Kirsan Ilyumzhinov, Nicholas Ilyumzhinov and Aleksey Orlov amongst others.
 Epstein, Julius. Operation Keelhaul, Devin-Adair, Connecticut, 1973.
 Grousset, René. The Empire of the Steppes: A History of Central Asia, Rutgers University Press, 1970.
 Halkovic, Stephen A. Jr. The Mongols of the West, Indiana University Uralic and Altaic Series, Volume 148, Larry Moses, Editor, Research Institute for Inner Asian Studies, Indiana University, Bloomington, 1985.
 Hoffmann, Joachim: Deutsche und Kalmyken 1942 bis 1945, Rombach Verlag, Friedberg, 1986.
 Kalder, Daniel. Lost Cosmonaut: Observations of an Anti-tourist
 Muñoz, Antonio J. The East Came West: Muslim, Hindu and Buddhist Volunteers in the German Armed Forces, 1941–1945, Chapter 8, "Followers of 'The Greater Way': Kalmück Volunteers in the German Army", Antonio J. Muñoz, Editor, Axis Europa Books, Bayside, NY, 2001.
 Tolstoy, Nikolai. The Secret Betrayal, 1944–1947, Charles Scribner's Sons, New York, 1977.

External links

 Official website of the Republic of Kalmykia  
 News from Kalmykia 
 News from Kalmykia 
 News from Kalmykia 
 Official website of the Kalmyk diplomatic representation at the President of the Russian Federation 
 Tourism in Kalmykia
 News about life in Kalmykia 
 Official website of the Kalmyk State University 
 News Agency of the Republic of Kalmykia 
 Ethnologue report on Kalmyk language
 Forum of Kalmyk Internet Community
 Kalmyk Portal
 Web-Portal of the Interregional Not-for-Profit Organization "The Leaders of Kalmykia"
 Mistaken Foreign Myths about Shambhala
 The man who bought chess, The Observer 29 October 2006
 The Buddhist hordes of Kalmykia, The Guardian September 19, 2006
 Kalmyk Buddhist Temple in Belgrade (1929–1944)
 Czech republics, New Humanist November–December, 2007
 Lagansky Express free bulletin board of the city Lagan
 Caspian fish City Lagan
 The nature of Kalmykia Video
 hotographs of Buddhist sites in Kalmykia and in Central Asia

 
1958 establishments in Russia
North Caucasus
Regions of Europe with multiple official languages
Russian-speaking countries and territories
Southern Federal District
States and territories established in 1958
Tibetan Buddhism